Christendom historically refers to the Christian states, Christian empires, Christian-majority countries and the countries in which Christianity dominates, prevails, or that it is culturally or historically intertwined with.

Following the spread of Christianity from the Levant to Europe and North Africa during the early Roman Empire, Christendom has been divided in the pre-existing Greek East and Latin West. Consequently, internal sects within Christian religion arose with their own beliefs and practices, centred around the cities of Rome (Western Christianity, whose community was called Western or Latin Christendom) and Constantinople (Eastern Christianity, whose community was called Eastern Christendom). From the 11th to the 13th centuries, Latin Christendom rose to the central role of the Western world. The history of the Christian world spans about 1,700 years and includes a variety of socio-political developments, as well as advances in the arts, architecture, literature, science, philosophy, and technology.

The term usually refers to the Middle Ages and the Early Modern period during which the Christian world represented a geopolitical power that was juxtaposed with both the pagan and especially the Muslim world.

Terminology 
The Anglo-Saxon term crīstendōm appears to have been invented in the 9th century by a scribe somewhere in southern England, possibly at the court of king Alfred the Great of Wessex. The scribe was translating Paulus Orosius' book History Against the Pagans (c. 416) and in need for a term to express the concept of the universal culture focused on Jesus Christ. It had the sense now taken by Christianity (as is still the case with the cognate Dutch christendom, where it denotes mostly the religion itself, just like the German Christentum.

The current sense of the word of "lands where Christianity is the dominant religion" emerged in Late Middle English (by c. 1400).

Canadian theology professor Douglas John Hall stated (1997) that "Christendom" [...] means literally the dominion or sovereignty of the Christian religion." Thomas John Curry, Roman Catholic auxiliary bishop of Los Angeles, defined (2001) Christendom as "the system dating from the fourth century by which governments upheld and promoted Christianity." Curry states that the end of Christendom came about because modern governments refused to "uphold the teachings, customs, ethos, and practice of Christianity." British church historian Diarmaid MacCulloch described (2010) Christendom as "the union between Christianity and secular power."

There is a common and nonliteral sense of the word that is much like the terms Western world, known world or Free World. The notion of "Europe" and the "Western World" has been intimately connected with the concept of "Christianity and Christendom"; many even attribute Christianity for being the link that created a unified European identity.

History

Rise of Christendom

Early Christianity spread in the Greek/Roman world and beyond as a 1st-century Jewish sect, which historians refer to as Jewish Christianity. It may be divided into two distinct phases: the apostolic period, when the first apostles were alive and organizing the Church, and the post-apostolic period, when an early episcopal structure developed, whereby bishoprics were governed by bishops (overseers).

The post-apostolic period concerns the time roughly after the death of the apostles when bishops emerged as overseers of urban Christian populations. The earliest recorded use of the terms Christianity (Greek ) and catholic (Greek ), dates to this period, the 2nd century, attributed to Ignatius of Antioch c. 107. Early Christendom would close at the end of imperial persecution of Christians after the ascension of Constantine the Great and the Edict of Milan in AD 313 and the First Council of Nicaea in 325.

According to Malcolm Muggeridge (1980), Christ founded Christianity, but Constantine founded Christendom. Canadian theology professor Douglas John Hall dates the 'inauguration of Christendom' to the 4th century, with Constantine playing the primary role (so much so that he equates Christendom with "Constantinianism") and Theodosius I (Edict of Thessalonica, 380) and Justinian I secondary roles.

Late Antiquity and Early Middle Ages

"Christendom" has referred to the medieval and renaissance notion of the Christian world as a polity. In essence, the earliest vision of Christendom was a vision of a Christian theocracy, a government founded upon and upholding Christian values, whose institutions are spread through and over with Christian doctrine. In this period, members of the Christian clergy wield political authority. The specific relationship between the political leaders and the clergy varied but, in theory, the national and political divisions were at times subsumed under the leadership of the church as an institution. This model of church-state relations was accepted by various Church leaders and political leaders in European history.

The Church gradually became a defining institution of the Roman Empire. Emperor Constantine issued the Edict of Milan in 313 proclaiming toleration for the Christian religion, and convoked the First Council of Nicaea in 325 whose Nicene Creed included belief in "one holy catholic and apostolic Church". Emperor Theodosius I made Nicene Christianity the state church of the Roman Empire with the Edict of Thessalonica of 380. In terms of prosperity and cultural life, the Byzantine Empire was one of the peaks in Christian history and Christian civilization, and Constantinople remained the leading city of the Christian world in size, wealth, and culture. There was a renewed interest in classical Greek philosophy, as well as an increase in literary output in vernacular Greek.

As the Western Roman Empire disintegrated into feudal kingdoms and principalities, the concept of Christendom changed as the western church became one of five patriarchates of the Pentarchy and the Christians of the Eastern Roman Empire developed. The Byzantine Empire was the last bastion of Christendom. Christendom would take a turn with the rise of the Franks, a Germanic tribe who converted to the Christian faith and entered into communion with Rome.

On Christmas Day 800 AD, Pope Leo III crowned Charlemagne, resulting in the creation of another Christian king beside the Christian emperor in the Byzantine state. The Carolingian Empire created a definition of Christendom in juxtaposition with the Byzantine Empire, that of a distributed versus centralized culture respectively.

The classical heritage flourished throughout the Middle Ages in both the Byzantine Greek East and the Latin West. In the Greek philosopher Plato's ideal state there are three major classes, which was representative of the idea of the “tripartite soul”, which is expressive of three functions or capacities of the human soul: “reason”, “the spirited element”, and “appetites” (or “passions”). Will Durant  made a convincing case that certain prominent features of Plato's ideal community where discernible in the organization, dogma and effectiveness of "the" Medieval Church in Europe:

... For a thousand years Europe was ruled by an order of guardians considerably like that which was visioned by our philosopher. During the Middle Ages it was customary to classify the population of Christendom into laboratores (workers), bellatores (soldiers), and oratores (clergy). The last group, though small in number, monopolized the instruments and opportunities of culture, and ruled with almost unlimited sway half of the most powerful continent on the globe. The clergy, like Plato's guardians, were placed in authority... by their talent as shown in ecclesiastical studies and administration, by their disposition to a life of meditation and simplicity, and ... by the influence of their relatives with the powers of state and church. In the latter half of the period in which they ruled [800 AD onwards], the clergy were as free from family cares as even Plato could desire [for such guardians]... [Clerical] Celibacy was part of the psychological structure of the power of the clergy; for on the one hand they were unimpeded by the narrowing egoism of the family, and on the other their apparent superiority to the call of the flesh added to the awe in which lay sinners held them.... In the latter half of the period in which they ruled, the clergy were as free from family cares as even Plato could desire.

Later Middle Ages and Renaissance

After the collapse of Charlemagne's empire, the southern remnants of the Holy Roman Empire became a collection of states loosely connected to the Holy See of Rome. Tensions between Pope Innocent III and secular rulers ran high, as the pontiff exerted control over their temporal counterparts in the west and vice versa. The pontificate of Innocent III is considered the height of temporal power of the papacy. The Corpus Christianum described the then-current notion of the community of all Christians united under the Roman Catholic Church. The community was to be guided by Christian values in its politics, economics and social life. Its legal basis was the corpus iuris canonica (body of canon law).

In the East, Christendom became more defined as the Byzantine Empire's gradual loss of territory to an expanding Islam and the Muslim conquest of Persia. This caused Christianity to become important to the Byzantine identity. Before the East–West Schism which divided the Church religiously, there had been the notion of a universal Christendom that included the East and the West. After the East–West Schism, hopes of regaining religious unity with the West were ended by the Fourth Crusade, when Crusaders conquered the Byzantine capital of Constantinople and hastened the decline of the Byzantine Empire on the path to its destruction. With the breakup of the Byzantine Empire into individual nations with nationalist Orthodox Churches, the term Christendom described Western Europe, Catholicism, Orthodox Byzantines, and other Eastern rites of the Church.

The Catholic Church's peak of authority over all European Christians and their common endeavours of the Christian community — for example, the Crusades, the fight against the Moors in the Iberian Peninsula and against the Ottomans in the Balkans — helped to develop a sense of communal identity against the obstacle of Europe's deep political divisions. The popes, formally just the bishops of Rome, claimed to be the focus of all Christendom, which was largely recognised in Western Christendom from the 11th century until the Reformation, but not in Eastern Christendom. Moreover, this authority was also sometimes abused, and fostered the Inquisition and anti-Jewish pogroms, to root out divergent elements and create a religiously uniform community. Ultimately, the Inquisition was done away with by order of Pope Innocent III.

Christendom ultimately was led into specific crisis in the late Middle Ages, when the kings of France managed to establish a French national church during the 14th century and the papacy became ever more aligned with the Holy Roman Empire of the German Nation. Known as the Western Schism, western Christendom was a split between three men, who were driven by politics rather than any real theological disagreement for simultaneously claiming to be the true pope. The Avignon Papacy developed a reputation for corruption that estranged major parts of Western Christendom. The Avignon schism was ended by the Council of Constance.

Before the modern period, Christendom was in a general crisis at the time of the Renaissance Popes because of the moral laxity of these pontiffs and their willingness to seek and rely on temporal power as secular rulers did. Many in the Catholic Church's hierarchy in the Renaissance became increasingly entangled with insatiable greed for material wealth and temporal power, which led to many reform movements, some merely wanting a moral reformation of the Church's clergy, while others repudiated the Church and separated from it in order to form new sects. The Italian Renaissance produced ideas or institutions by which men living in society could be held together in harmony. In the early 16th century, Baldassare Castiglione (The Book of the Courtier) laid out his vision of the ideal gentleman and lady, while Machiavelli cast a jaundiced eye on "la verità effetuale delle cose" — the actual truth of things — in The Prince, composed, humanist style, chiefly of parallel ancient and modern examples of Virtù. Some Protestant movements grew up along lines of mysticism or renaissance humanism (cf. Erasmus). The Catholic Church fell partly into general neglect under the Renaissance Popes, whose inability to govern the Church by showing personal example of high moral standards set the climate for what would ultimately become the Protestant Reformation. During the Renaissance, the papacy was mainly run by the wealthy families and also had strong secular interests. To safeguard Rome and the connected Papal States the popes became necessarily involved in temporal matters, even leading armies, as the great patron of arts Pope Julius II did. During these intermediate times, popes strove to make Rome the capital of Christendom while projecting it through art, architecture, and literature as the center of a Golden Age of unity, order, and peace.

Professor Frederick J. McGinness described Rome as essential in understanding the legacy the Church and its representatives encapsulated best by The Eternal City: No other city in Europe matches Rome in its traditions, history, legacies, and influence in the Western world. Rome in the Renaissance under the papacy not only acted as guardian and transmitter of these elements stemming from the Roman Empire but also assumed the role as artificer and interpreter of its myths and meanings for the peoples of Europe from the Middle Ages to modern times... Under the patronage of the popes, whose wealth and income were exceeded only by their ambitions, the city became a cultural center for master architects, sculptors, musicians, painters, and artisans of every kind...In its myth and message, Rome had become the sacred city of the popes, the prime symbol of a triumphant Catholicism, the center of orthodox Christianity, a new Jerusalem.

It is clearly noticeable that the popes of the Italian Renaissance have been subjected by many writers with an overly harsh tone. Pope Julius II, for example, was not only an effective secular leader in military affairs, a deviously effective politician but foremost one of the greatest patron of the Renaissance period and person who also encouraged open criticism from noted humanists.

The blossoming of renaissance humanism was made very much possible due to the universality of the institutions of Catholic Church and represented by personalities such as Pope Pius II, Nicolaus Copernicus, Leon Battista Alberti,  Desiderius Erasmus, sir Thomas More, Bartolomé de Las Casas, Leonardo da Vinci and Teresa of Ávila. George Santayana in his work The Life of Reason postulated the tenets of the all encompassing order the Church had brought and as the repository of the legacy of classical antiquity:

The enterprise of individuals or of small aristocratic bodies has meantime sown the world which we call civilised with some seeds and nuclei of order. There are scattered about a variety of churches, industries, academies, and governments. But the universal order once dreamt of and nominally almost established, the empire of universal peace, all-permeating rational art, and philosophical worship, is mentioned no more. An unformulated conception, the prerational ethics of private privilege and national unity, fills the background of men's minds. It represents feudal traditions rather than the tendency really involved in contemporary industry, science, or philanthropy. Those dark ages, from which our political practice is derived, had a political theory which we should do well to study; for their theory about a universal empire and a Catholic church was in turn the echo of a former age of reason, when a few men conscious of ruling the world had for a moment sought to survey it as a whole and to rule it justly.

Reformation and Early Modern era

Developments in western philosophy and European events brought change to the notion of the Corpus Christianum. The Hundred Years' War accelerated the process of transforming France from a feudal monarchy to a centralized state. The rise of strong, centralized monarchies denoted the European transition from feudalism to capitalism. By the end of the Hundred Years' War, both France and England were able to raise enough money through taxation to create independent standing armies. In the Wars of the Roses, Henry Tudor took the crown of England. His heir, the absolute king Henry VIII establishing the English church.

In modern history, the Reformation and rise of modernity in the early 16th century entailed a change in the Corpus Christianum. In the Holy Roman Empire, the Peace of Augsburg of 1555 officially ended the idea among secular leaders that all Christians must be united under one church. The principle of cuius regio, eius religio ("whose the region is, his religion") established the religious, political and geographic divisions of Christianity, and this was established with the Treaty of Westphalia in 1648, which legally ended the concept of a single Christian hegemony in the territories of the Holy Roman Empire, despite the Catholic Church's doctrine that it alone is the one true Church founded by Christ.
Subsequently, each government determined the religion of their own state. Christians living in states where their denomination was not the established one were guaranteed the right to practice their faith in public during allotted hours and in private at their will. At times there were mass expulsions of dissenting faiths as happened with the Salzburg Protestants. Some people passed as adhering to the official church, but instead lived as Nicodemites or crypto-protestants.

The European wars of religion are usually taken to have ended with the Treaty of Westphalia (1648), or arguably, including the Nine Years' War and the War of the Spanish Succession in this period, with the Treaty of Utrecht of 1713. In the 18th century, the focus shifts away from religious conflicts, either between Christian factions or against the external threat of Islamic factions.

End of Christendom 

The European Miracle, the Age of Enlightenment and the formation of the great colonial empires together with the beginning decline of the Ottoman Empire mark the end of the geopolitical "history of Christendom". Instead, the focus of Western history shifts to the development of the nation-state, accompanied by increasing atheism and secularism, culminating with the French Revolution and the Napoleonic Wars at the turn of the 19th century.

Writing in 1997, Canadian theology professor Douglas John Hall argued that Christendom had either fallen already or was in its death throes; although its end was gradual and not as clear to pin down as its 4th-century establishment, the "transition to the post-Constantinian, or post-Christendom, situation (...) has already been in process for a century or two," beginning with the 18th-century rationalist Enlightenment and the French Revolution (the first attempt to topple the Christian establishment). American Catholic bishop Thomas John Curry stated (2001) that the end of Christendom came about because modern governments refused to "uphold the teachings, customs, ethos, and practice of Christianity." He argued the First Amendment to the United States Constitution (1791) and the Second Vatican Council's Declaration on Religious Freedom (1965) are two of the most important documents setting the stage for its end. According to British historian Diarmaid MacCulloch (2010), Christendom was 'killed' by the First World War (1914–18), which led to the fall of the three main Christian empires (Russian, German and Austrian) of Europe, as well as the Ottoman Empire, rupturing the Eastern Christian communities that had existed on its territory. The Christian empires were replaced by secular, even anti-clerical republics seeking to definitively keep the churches out of politics. The only surviving monarchy with an established church, Britain, was severely damaged by the war, lost most of Ireland due to Catholic–Protestant infighting, and was starting to lose grip on its colonies.

Changes in worldwide Christianity over the last century have been significant, since 1900, Christianity has spread rapidly in the Global South and Third World countries. The late 20th century has shown the shift of Christian adherence to the Third World and the Southern Hemisphere in general, by 2010 about 157 countries and territories in the world had Christian majorities.

Classical culture

Western culture, throughout most of its history, has been nearly equivalent to Christian culture, and many of the population of the Western hemisphere could broadly be described as cultural Christians. The notion of "Europe" and the "Western World" has been intimately connected with the concept of "Christianity and Christendom"; many even attribute Christianity for being the link that created a unified European identity. Historian Paul Legutko of Stanford University said the Catholic Church is "at the center of the development of the values, ideas, science, laws, and institutions which constitute what we call Western civilization."

Though Western culture contained several polytheistic religions during its early years under the Greek and Roman Empires, as the centralized Roman power waned, the dominance of the Catholic Church was the only consistent force in Western Europe. Until the Age of Enlightenment, Christian culture guided the course of philosophy, literature, art, music and science. Christian disciplines of the respective arts have subsequently developed into Christian philosophy, Christian art, Christian music, Christian literature etc. Art and literature, law, education, and politics were preserved in the teachings of the Church, in an environment that, otherwise, would have probably seen their loss. The Church founded many cathedrals, universities, monasteries and seminaries, some of which continue to exist today. Medieval Christianity created the first modern universities. The Catholic Church established a hospital system in Medieval Europe that vastly improved upon the Roman valetudinaria. These hospitals were established to cater to "particular social groups marginalized by poverty, sickness, and age," according to historian of hospitals, Guenter Risse. Christianity also had a strong impact on all other aspects of life: marriage and family, education, the humanities and sciences, the political and social order, the economy, and the arts.

Christianity had a significant impact on education and science and medicine as the church created the bases of the Western system of education, and was the sponsor of founding universities in the Western world as the university is generally regarded as an institution that has its origin in the Medieval Christian setting. Many clerics throughout history have made significant contributions to science and Jesuits in particular have made numerous significant contributions to the development of science. The cultural influence of Christianity includes social welfare, founding hospitals, economics (as the Protestant work ethic), natural law (which would later influence the creation of international law), politics, architecture, literature, personal hygiene, and family life. Christianity played a role in ending practices common among pagan societies, such as human sacrifice, slavery, infanticide and polygamy.

Art and literature

Writings and poetry

Christian literature is writing that deals with Christian themes and incorporates the Christian world view. This constitutes a huge body of extremely varied writing. Christian poetry is any poetry that contains Christian teachings, themes, or references. The influence of Christianity on poetry has been great in any area that Christianity has taken hold. Christian poems often directly reference the Bible, while others provide allegory.

Supplemental arts

Christian art is art produced in an attempt to illustrate, supplement and portray in tangible form the principles of Christianity. Virtually all Christian groupings use or have used art to some extent. The prominence of art and the media, style, and representations change; however, the unifying theme is ultimately the representation of the life and times of Jesus and in some cases the Old Testament. Depictions of saints are also common, especially in Anglicanism, Roman Catholicism, and Eastern Orthodoxy.

Illumination

An illuminated manuscript is a manuscript in which the text is supplemented by the addition of decoration. The earliest surviving substantive illuminated manuscripts are from the period AD 400 to 600, primarily produced in Ireland, Constantinople and Italy. The majority of surviving manuscripts are from the Middle Ages, although many illuminated manuscripts survive from the 15th century Renaissance, along with a very limited number from Late Antiquity.

Most illuminated manuscripts were created as codices, which had superseded scrolls; some isolated single sheets survive. A very few illuminated manuscript fragments survive on papyrus. Most medieval manuscripts, illuminated or not, were written on parchment (most commonly of calf, sheep, or goat skin), but most manuscripts important enough to illuminate were written on the best quality of parchment, called vellum, traditionally made of unsplit calfskin, though high quality parchment from other skins was also called parchment.

Iconography

Christian art began, about two centuries after Christ, by borrowing motifs from Roman Imperial imagery, classical Greek and Roman religion and popular art. Religious images are used to some extent by the Abrahamic Christian faith, and often contain highly complex iconography, which reflects centuries of accumulated tradition. In the Late Antique period iconography began to be standardised, and to relate more closely to Biblical texts, although many gaps in the canonical Gospel narratives were plugged with matter from the apocryphal gospels. Eventually the Church would succeed in weeding most of these out, but some remain, like the ox and ass in the Nativity of Christ.

An icon is a religious work of art, most commonly a painting, from Eastern Christianity. Christianity has used symbolism from its very beginnings. In both East and West, numerous iconic types of Christ, Mary and saints and other subjects were developed; the number of named types of icons of Mary, with or without the infant Christ, was especially large in the East, whereas Christ Pantocrator was much the commonest image of Christ.

Christian symbolism invests objects or actions with an inner meaning expressing Christian ideas. Christianity has borrowed from the common stock of significant symbols known to most periods and to all regions of the world. Religious symbolism is effective when it appeals to both the intellect and the emotions. Especially important depictions of Mary include the Hodegetria and Panagia types. Traditional models evolved for narrative paintings, including large cycles covering the events of the Life of Christ, the Life of the Virgin, parts of the Old Testament, and, increasingly, the lives of popular saints. Especially in the West, a system of attributes developed for identifying individual figures of saints by a standard appearance and symbolic objects held by them; in the East they were more likely to identified by text labels.

Each saint has a story and a reason why he or she led an exemplary life. Symbols have been used to tell these stories throughout the history of the Church. A number of Christian saints are traditionally represented by a symbol or iconic motif associated with their life, termed an attribute or emblem, in order to identify them. The study of these forms part of iconography in Art history.

Architecture

Christian architecture encompasses a wide range of both secular and religious styles from the foundation of Christianity to the present day, influencing the design and construction of buildings and structures in Christian culture.

Buildings were at first adapted from those originally intended for other purposes but, with the rise of distinctively ecclesiastical architecture, church buildings came to influence secular ones which have often imitated religious architecture. In the 20th century, the use of new materials, such as concrete, as well as simpler styles has had its effect upon the design of churches and arguably the flow of influence has been reversed. From the birth of Christianity to the present, the most significant period of transformation for Christian architecture in the west was the Gothic cathedral. In the east, Byzantine architecture was a continuation of Roman architecture.

Philosophy 

Christian philosophy is a term to describe the fusion of various fields of philosophy with the theological doctrines of Christianity. Scholasticism, which means "that [which] belongs to the school", and was a method of learning taught by the academics (or school people) of medieval universities c. 1100–1500. Scholasticism originally started to reconcile the philosophy of the ancient classical philosophers with medieval Christian theology. Scholasticism is not a philosophy or theology in itself but a tool and method for learning which places emphasis on dialectical reasoning.

Christian civilization

Medieval conditions 

The Byzantine Empire, which was the most sophisticated culture during antiquity, suffered under Muslim conquests limiting its scientific prowess during the Medieval period. Christian Western Europe had suffered a catastrophic loss of knowledge following the fall of the Western Roman Empire. But thanks to the Church scholars such as Aquinas and Buridan, the West carried on at least the spirit of scientific inquiry which would later lead to Europe's taking the lead in science during the Scientific Revolution using translations of medieval works.

Medieval technology refers to the technology used in medieval Europe under Christian rule. After the Renaissance of the 12th century, medieval Europe saw a radical change in the rate of new inventions, innovations in the ways of managing traditional means of production, and economic growth. The period saw major technological advances, including the adoption of gunpowder and the astrolabe, the invention of spectacles, and greatly improved water mills, building techniques, agriculture in general, clocks, and ships. The latter advances made possible the dawn of the Age of Exploration. The development of water mills was impressive, and extended from agriculture to sawmills both for timber and stone, probably derived from Roman technology. By the time of the Domesday Book, most large villages in Britain had mills. They also were widely used in mining, as described by Georg Agricola in De Re Metallica for raising ore from shafts, crushing ore, and even powering bellows.

Significant in this respect were advances within the fields of navigation. The compass and astrolabe along with advances in shipbuilding, enabled the navigation of the World Oceans and thus domination of the worlds economic trade. Gutenberg’s printing press made possible a dissemination of knowledge to a wider population, that would not only lead to a gradually more egalitarian society, but one more able to dominate other cultures, drawing from a vast reserve of knowledge and experience.

Renaissance innovations

During the Renaissance, great advances occurred in geography, astronomy, chemistry, physics, math, manufacturing, and engineering. The rediscovery of ancient scientific texts was accelerated after the Fall of Constantinople, and the invention of printing which would democratize learning and allow a faster propagation of new ideas. Renaissance technology is the set of artifacts and customs, spanning roughly the 14th through the 16th century. The era is marked by such profound technical advancements like the printing press, linear perspectivity, patent law, double shell domes or Bastion fortresses. Draw-books of the Renaissance artist-engineers such as Taccola and Leonardo da Vinci give a deep insight into the mechanical technology then known and applied.

Renaissance science spawned the Scientific Revolution; science and technology began a cycle of mutual advancement. The Scientific Renaissance was the early phase of the Scientific Revolution. In the two-phase model of early modern science: a Scientific Renaissance of the 15th and 16th centuries, focused on the restoration of the natural knowledge of the ancients; and a Scientific Revolution of the 17th century, when scientists shifted from recovery to innovation. Some scholars and historians attributes Christianity to having contributed to the rise of the Scientific Revolution.

Demographics

Geographic spread

In 2009, according to the Encyclopædia Britannica, Christianity was the majority religion in Europe (including Russia) with 80%, Latin America with 92%, North America with 81%, and Oceania with 79%. There are also large Christian communities in other parts of the world, such as China, India and Central Asia, where Christianity is the second-largest religion after Islam. The United States is home to the world's largest Christian population, followed by Brazil and Mexico.

Many Christians not only live under, but also have an official status in, a state religion of the following nations: Argentina (Roman Catholic Church), Armenia (Armenian Apostolic Church), Costa Rica (Roman Catholic Church), Denmark (Church of Denmark), El Salvador (Roman Catholic Church), England (Church of England), Georgia (Georgian Orthodox Church), Greece (Church of Greece), Iceland (Church of Iceland), Liechtenstein (Roman Catholic Church), Malta (Roman Catholic Church), Monaco (Roman Catholic Church), Romania (Romanian Orthodox Church), Norway (Church of Norway), Vatican City (Roman Catholic Church), Switzerland (Roman Catholic Church, Swiss Reformed Church and Christian Catholic Church of Switzerland).

Number of adherents
The estimated number of Christians in the world ranges from 2.2 billion to 2.4 billion people. The faith represents approximately one-third of the world's population and is the largest religion in the world, with the three largest groups of Christians being the Catholic Church, Protestantism, and the Eastern Orthodox Church. The largest Christian denomination is the Catholic Church, with an estimated 1.2 billion adherents.

Notable Christian organizations
A religious order is a lineage of communities and organizations of people who live in some way set apart from society in accordance with their specific religious devotion, usually characterized by the principles of its founder's religious practice. In contrast, the term Holy Orders is used by many Christian churches to refer to ordination or to a group of individuals who are set apart for a special role or ministry. Historically, the word "order" designated an established civil body or corporation with a hierarchy, and ordination meant legal incorporation into an ordo. The word "holy" refers to the Church. In context, therefore, a holy order is set apart for ministry in the Church. Religious orders are composed of initiates (laity) and, in some traditions, ordained clergies.

Various organizations include:
 In the Roman Catholic Church, religious institutes and secular institutes are the major forms of institutes of consecrated life, similar to which are societies of apostolic life. They are organizations of laity or clergy who live a common life under the guidance of a fixed rule and the leadership of a superior. (ed., see :Category: Catholic orders and societies for a particular listing.)
 Anglican religious orders are communities of laity or clergy in the Anglican churches who live under a common rule of life. (ed., see :Category: Anglican organizations for a particular listing)

Christianity law and ethics

Church and state framing

Within the framework of Christianity, there are at least three possible definitions for Church law. One is the Torah/Mosaic Law (from what Christians consider to be the Old Testament) also called Divine Law or Biblical law. Another is the instructions of Jesus of Nazareth in the Gospel (sometimes referred to as the Law of Christ or the New Commandment or the New Covenant). A third is canon law which is the internal ecclesiastical law governing the Roman Catholic Church, the Eastern Orthodox churches, and the Anglican Communion of churches. The way that such church law is legislated, interpreted and at times adjudicated varies widely among these three bodies of churches. In all three traditions, a canon was initially a rule adopted by a council (From Greek kanon / κανών, Hebrew kaneh / קנה, for rule, standard, or measure); these canons formed the foundation of canon law.

Christian ethics in general has tended to stress the need for grace, mercy, and forgiveness because of human weakness and developed while Early Christians were subjects of the Roman Empire. From the time Nero blamed Christians for setting Rome ablaze (64 AD) until Galerius (311 AD), persecutions against Christians erupted periodically. Consequently, Early Christian ethics included discussions of how believers should relate to Roman authority and to the empire.

Under the Emperor Constantine I (312-337), Christianity became a legal religion. While some scholars debate whether Constantine's conversion to Christianity was authentic or simply matter of political expediency, Constantine's decree made the empire safe for Christian practice and belief. Consequently, issues of Christian doctrine, ethics and church practice were debated openly, see for example the First Council of Nicaea and the First seven Ecumenical Councils. By the time of Theodosius I (379-395), Christianity had become the state religion of the empire. With Christianity in power, ethical concerns broaden and included discussions of the proper role of the state.

Render unto Caesar… is the beginning of a phrase attributed to Jesus in the synoptic gospels which reads in full, "Render unto Caesar the things which are Caesar’s, and unto God the things that are God’s". This phrase has become a widely quoted summary of the relationship between Christianity and secular authority. The gospels say that when Jesus gave his response, his interrogators "marvelled, and left him, and went their way." Time has not resolved an ambiguity in this phrase, and people continue to interpret this passage to support various positions that are poles apart. The traditional division, carefully determined, in Christian thought is the state and church have separate spheres of influence.

Thomas Aquinas thoroughly discussed that human law is positive law which means that it is natural law applied by governments to societies. All human laws were to be judged by their conformity to the natural law. An unjust law was in a sense no law at all. At this point, the natural law was not only used to pass judgment on the moral worth of various laws, but also to determine what the law said in the first place. This could result in some tension. Late ecclesiastical writers followed in his footsteps.

Democratic ideology

Christian democracy is a political ideology that seeks to apply Christian principles to public policy. It emerged in 19th-century Europe, largely under the influence of Catholic social teaching. In a number of countries, the democracy's Christian ethos has been diluted by secularisation. In practice, Christian democracy is often considered conservative on cultural, social and moral issues and progressive on fiscal and economic issues. In places, where their opponents have traditionally been secularist socialists and social democrats, Christian democratic parties are moderately conservative, whereas in other cultural and political environments they can lean to the left.

Women's roles

Attitudes and beliefs about the roles and responsibilities of women in Christianity vary considerably today as they have throughout the last two millennia — evolving along with or counter to the societies in which Christians have lived. The Bible and Christianity historically have been interpreted as excluding women from church leadership and placing them in submissive roles in marriage. Male leadership has been assumed in the church and within marriage, society and government.

Some contemporary writers describe the role of women in the life of the church as having been downplayed, overlooked, or denied throughout much of Christian history. Paradigm shifts in gender roles in society and also many churches has inspired reevaluation by many Christians of some long-held attitudes to the contrary. Christian egalitarians have increasingly argued for equal roles for men and women in marriage, as well as for the ordination of women to the clergy. Contemporary conservatives meanwhile have reasserted what has been termed a "complementarian" position, promoting the traditional belief that the Bible ordains different roles and responsibilities for women and men in the Church and family.

See also 
 
 
 
 
 
 
 
 
 
 
 
 Union of Christendom, a traditional Catholic view of ecumenism

Notes

References

Bibliography

21st century Sources
 
 

20th century sources

 
 
 
 

19th century sources

 Hull, Moses. Encyclopedia of Biblical Spiritualism; Or, A Concordance to the Principal Passages of the Old and New Testament Scriptures Which Prove or Imply Spiritualism; Together with a Brief History of the Origin of Many of the Important Books of the Bible. Chicago: M. Hull, 1895. (ed., reprint version is available)
 Bosanquet, Bernard. The Civilization of Christendom, And Other Studies. London: S. Sonnenschein, 1893.

Further reading
 Bainton, Roland H. (1966). Christendom: a Short History of Christianity and Its Impact on Western Civilization, in series, Harper Colophon Books. New York: Harper & Row. 2 vol., ill.
Molland, Einar (1959) Christendom: the Christian churches, their doctrines, constitutional forms and ways of worship. London: A. & R. Mowbray & Co. (first published in Norwegian in 1953 as Konfesjonskunnskap).
 Whalen, Brett Edward (2009). Dominion of God: Christendom and Apocalypse in the Middle Ages. Cambridge, Mass.: Harvard University Press.

External links

Websites
 

 
Christian terminology
Christian organizations
Cultural regions
Ecclesiology
European civilizations
Historical regions
World Christianity